Muhammad Hafizullah is a Pakistani Professor of cardiology who served as Vice Chancellor of Khyber Medical University (KMU) in Peshawar Chief Executive of Lady Reading Hospital and Head of Cardiology Department of Lady Reading Hospital. He is the Project Director of the Peshawar Institute of Cardiology and has contributed to national guidelines on thrombolysis, acute coronary syndrome, and ST elevation myocardial infarction developed by the Pakistan Cardiac Society.

Education and career 
Hafizullah studied at Cadet College Hasan Abdal, earned his medical degree from Khyber Medical College in 1979, and won Foreign scholarship for the Best Graduates for higher studies in England.

He joined the cardiology department of the Postgraduate Medical Institute at Lady Reading Hospital in Peshawar in 1984. Since then, he has held various positions:

 Vice Chancellor, Khyber Medical University, Peshawar 
 Dean, Faculty of Cardiology, College of Physician and Surgeons, Pakistan 
 Chief Executive, Lady Reading Hospital, Peshawar (2006-2008)
 Cardiology examiner for the College of Physicians and Surgeons Pakistan (CPSP)
 Governor elect, Pakistan chapter of American College of Cardiology
 Editor in Chief of Pakistan Heart Journal 
 Member of the Faculty of Cardiology, CPSP
 Supervisor for trainees preparing for the CPSP cardiology exam
 Head of the Department of Cardiology, Lady Reading Hospital
 Head of the Department of Cardiology, Hayatabad Medical Complex, Peshawar
 Vice dean of research, Postgraduate Medical Institute, Lady Reading Hospital
 Project Director, Peshawar Institute of Cardiology

Under the umbrella of the Pakistan Cardiac Society, Hafizullah contributed to national guidelines on thrombolysis, acute coronary syndrome, myocardial infarction, stable angina, hypertension, and preventive cardiology. He delivers lectures on preventive cardiology and has written hundreds of articles in leading newspapers and journals.

Bibliography 
Hafizullah is the author of eleven books in English: 
 Know Thy Heart (2007, Ferozsons) 
 Heal Thy Heart (2007, Ferozsons) 
 Heart to Heart (2005, Ferozsons)
 My Heart, My Mirror (2010, Ferozsons) 
 Musings of Heart (2011, Ferozsons) 
 Treasures of Heart (2013, Ferozsons) 
 Heart of Heart (2005, Jahangir Book Depot)
 Sagas of Heart (2008, Jahangir)
 Woes of Heart' '  (2013 Ferozsons)
 Ruminations of Heart (2015 Ferozsons)
 Matters of Heart (2018 Ferozsons Ltd

He has also written three books in Urdu: 
 Dil Ki Dunya (2012, Ferozsons) 
 Dil Ki Batain (2012, Ferozsons) 
 Dil Kai Khazeenai (2013, Ferozsons) 
In addition, he has published more than 450 articles as part of regular newspaper columns: "Know Your Heart" in The Frontier Post, "From the Core of My Heart" in The News International, "Heart to Heart" in The Statesman, "Dil ka Maamla" in Daily Mashriq, and "Dil ki Batain" in Daily Aaj.

 Affiliations 
Hafizullah became a member of the Royal College of Physicians in 1983, of the Royal Colleges of Physicians of Edinburgh and Glasgow in 1995, and of the American College of Cardiology in 2000. He has also received fellowships from the Society for Cardiac Angiography and Interventions, the Asian Pacific Society of Cardiology, the European Society of Cardiology, the College of Physicians and Surgeons Pakistan, and the American College of Physicians.

Other affiliations and positions include:
 President, Pakistan Cardiac Society
 Ex-Vice President, Pakistan Hypertension League
 Governor, International Society of Cardiovascular Pharmacotherapy 
 Ex-Vice President, Asian Pacific Cardiac Society
 Member of Syndicate of the University of Peshawar
 Member of Syndicate of the University of Malakand 
 Member of Senate, Shaheed Zulfiqar Ali Bhutto Medical University
 Member of Syndicate of the Kohat University of Science and Technology 
 Member of Board of Governors, CECOS University 
 Member of Board of Governors, Paraplegic Centre, Peshawar 
 Member of National Ethical Board, Pakistan Health Research Council
 Editor in Chief, Pakistan Heart Journal, Pakistan Cardiac Society (since 2011)
 Editor in Chief, Journal of the Postgraduate Medical Institute, Lady Reading Hospital (1993–2009) 
 Patron, KMU Journal'', Khyber Medical University 
 Chairman, Council on Preventive Cardiology, Pakistan Cardiac Society
 Member of Executive Council, Pakistan Medical and Dental Council
 Member of Board of Governors, Air University, Islamabad
 Member of Syndicate of King Edward Medical University

See also 
Khyber Medical University

References 

Pakistani cardiologists
Pashtun people
Cadet College Hasan Abdal alumni
Khyber Medical College alumni
Fellows of the Royal College of Physicians and Surgeons of Glasgow
Living people
Fellows of the American College of Cardiology
Year of birth missing (living people)